Hetmanate ( or ), a political entity, may refer to:

 Cossack Hetmanate, a Ukrainian Cossack state 1649–1775
 Left-bank Ukraine, 1667 – 18th century
 Ukrainian State, sometimes also called the Second Hetmanate, 1918

See also
Hetman, a political title from Central and Eastern Europe